Xitou Nature Education Area or Xitou Bamboo Forest is a forest park in Lugu Village, Lugu Township, Nantou County, Taiwan.

Name
Xitou is derived from a Chinese word with the meaning of the origin of river.

History
During the Japanese rule of Taiwan, the forest was used as an experimental forest for University of Tokyo students. Later after the handover of Taiwan from Japan to the Republic of China in 1945, the forest was declared a nature reserve and  named Xitou Nature Education Area in 1970. On 11 September 2016, a 2,800-year old giant tree fell after long heavy rain, injuring three visitors.

Geography
The forest is located within a valley of mountain on its three sides and consists of many bamboos. It also has Ginkgo biloba garden. It is located at an average altitude of 1,150 meters above sea level and spans over an area of 2,500 hectares. The highest mountain peak within the forest reaches 2,025 meters above sea level, which is Mount Lingtou. It has a cool climate all year round with average monthly temperature ranges from 11-28°C and average monthly of 16.6°C. The average annual rainfall is 2,635.18 mm. The forest is home to more than 70 species of bird.

Facilities

The forest features many hiking trails and pavements, 22.6-meter high and 180-meter long skywalk through canopies and observatory at a height of more than 2,000 meters above sea level. It also provides electric cars rental, shops, Vacation Forest Natural Ecology Exhibition Center, tourist service center, restaurant and hotel.

Activities
The main objective of the forest is the promotion of natural education of nursing natural ecology. The forest is part of experimental forest belongs to National Taiwan University.

Transportation
The forest is accessible by bus from Taichung, Caotun Township, Nantou City, Zhushan Township and Douliu City.

See also
 Geography of Taiwan

References

1970 establishments in Taiwan
Parks in Taiwan
Geography of Nantou County
Tourist attractions in Nantou County